opened within the Ninomaru (secondary enclosure) of Tsurumaru Castle in Kagoshima, Kagoshima Prefecture, Japan, in 1985. The collection includes works by local artists Kuroda Seiki, Fujishima Takeji, and Wada Eisaku, as well as Western painters Claude Monet and Paul Cézanne.

See also
 Reimeikan, Kagoshima Prefectural Center for Historical Material
 List of Cultural Properties of Japan - paintings (Kagoshima)

References

External links
  Kagoshima City Museum of Art
  Collection
  Digital Museum

Museums in Kagoshima Prefecture
Buildings and structures in Kagoshima
Art museums and galleries in Japan
Art museums established in 1985
1985 establishments in Japan